Pirgachha is a village in Lahiripara Union of Bogra Sadar Upazila, Bogra District, Bangladesh.

Geography 

Demographics
According to the 2011 Bangladesh census, the population of the village was 793. 57% are Muslims and 43% are Hindus.

Market 
The market has 150 vegetable shops, 3 showrooms and 5 tea stalls in this village.

Religion 
The village hosts two mosques.

Education 
The village has a 3 kindergartens, government primary school, and a high school.

References

Villages in Bogra District
Villages in Rajshahi Division